This is a list of the moths of family Drepanidae that are found in Canada. It also acts as an index to the species articles and forms part of the full List of moths of Canada.

Following the species name, there is an abbreviation that indicates the Canadian provinces or territories in which the species can be found.

Western Canada
BC = British Columbia
AB = Alberta
SK = Saskatchewan
MB = Manitoba
YT = Yukon
NT = Northwest Territories
NU = Nunavut

Eastern Canada
ON = Ontario
QC = Quebec
NB = New Brunswick
NS = Nova Scotia
PE = Prince Edward Island
NF = Newfoundland
LB = Labrador

Subfamily Drepaninae
Drepana arcuata Walker, 1855 -NF, LB, NS, PE, NB, QC, ON, MB, SK, AB, BC, NT
Drepana bilineata (Packard, 1864) -NF, NS, PE, NB, QC, ON, MB, SK, AB, BC
Eudeilinia herminiata (Guenée, [1858]) -NF, NS, PE, NB, QC, ON, MB, SK, AB, BC
Oreta rosea (Walker, 1855) -NF, NS, PE, NB, QC, ON, MB, SK, AB, BC

Subfamily Thyatirinae
Ceranemota albertae Clarke, 1938 -SK, AB, BC
Ceranemota fasciata (Barnes & McDunnough, 1910)- BC
Ceranemota improvisa (Edwards, 1873) -BC
Habrosyne gloriosa (Guenée, 1852) -QC, ON
Habrosyne scripta (Gosse, 1840) -NF, LB, NS, PE, NB, QC, ON, MB, SK, AB, BC
Pseudothyatira cymatophoroides (Guenée, 1852) -NF, LB, NS, NB, QC, ON, MB, SK, AB, BC
Euthyatira pudens (Guenée, 1852) -NB, QC, ON, MB, SK, AB, BC
Euthyatira semicircularis (Grote, 1881) -BC

External links
Moths of Canada at the Canadian Biodiversity Information Facility

Canada